Senbon Hisanobu (July 13, 1827 – October 15, 1885) was a Japanese politician of the early Meiji period who served as governor of Hiroshima Prefecture in Nov. 15–27, 1871.

Governors of Hiroshima
1827 births
1885 deaths
Japanese Home Ministry government officials